The whitish dwarf squirrel (Prosciurillus leucomus) is a species of rodent in the family Sciuridae. It is endemic to Indonesia, where it is found on Sulawesi, Buton Island, Muna Island, Kabeana Island, and adjacent islands to the southeast of Sulawesi.

References

Prosciurillus
Rodents of Sulawesi
Mammals described in 1844
Taxonomy articles created by Polbot